The Valderaduey is a river in central Spain which flows into the Douro on its right bank. In the year 949, an earthquake altered the course of the river.

Geography 

The Valderaduey originates on the  mountain in Renedo de Valderaduey municipality, Province of León From there, the river flows south, passing through the municipalities of Sahagún, Becilla de Valderaduey, Castroponce, San Martín de Valderaduey, Cañizo and Villalpando before flowing into the right bank of the Duero in the municipality of Zamora.

The main tributaries of the Valderaduey are the Río Del Hoyo, Río Pequeno, Río Viejo, Río Bustillo, Río Navajos, Río Salado.

References 

Rivers of Spain
Rivers of Castile and León